dnata Travel is the biggest provider of travel services and products for retail and business customers for the Middle Eastern market. The company is based in Dubai. It is a business segment of dnata, and as such, part of The Emirates Group.  It has an annual turnover rate of $500 million.

On June 27, 2008 dnata Travel Services bought a 20% stake in United Kingdom-based Hogg Robinson Group making it the largest shareholder of that company.

Locations
dnata Travel has its headquarters located in dnata Airline Center in the Sheikh Zayed Road, Dubai, UAE.  As the retail arm of dnata offering travel services and products, dnata Travel Services has 44 retail outlets scattered within Dubai.

In January 2009, dnata Travel Services and HRG launched a satellite in Kabul, Afghanistan., expanding the company's reach further outward in the Middle East region.

Lines of businesses

dnata Travel Services is further divided into the following lines of businesses

Gulf Ventures
dnata Offshore & Marine Services
MMI Travel
dnata Holidays
dnata Hajj and Umrah
HRG MEWA
Luxury Air Travel
dnata Travel
Government Travel Services
Airline Affairs

Awards and achievements

World’s Leading Travel Management Company:  World Travel Awards 2009.
UAE's Leading Destination Management Company: Gulf Ventures - World Travel Awards 2009

References

Travel agencies
Companies based in Dubai
Travel and holiday companies of the United Arab Emirates
The Emirates Group